Hafiz Uddin Ahmed (born 3 February 1946) is a Bangladesh Jatiya Party politician and a Jatiya Sangsad member representing the Thakurgaon-3 constituency for the 4th term.

Early life
Ahmed was born on 3 February 1946. He studied until completing his HSC.

Career
Ahmed was elected to parliament in 2001 as a candidate of Jatiya Party from Thakurgaon-3. He was re-elected in the 2008 Bangladesh General Election as a candidate of Bangladesh Awami League led Grand Alliance. He won 2023 by-election as an Jatiya Party candidate.

References

Living people
1946 births
Bangladesh Jatiya Party politicians
4th Jatiya Sangsad members
8th Jatiya Sangsad members
9th Jatiya Sangsad members
11th Jatiya Sangsad members